The 1918 Columbus Panhandles season was their 13th season in existence. The team played in the Ohio League. According to the only records available, the team played in just one game, which they lost.

Schedule

References
Pro Football Archives: 1918 Columbus Panhandles season

Columbus Panhandles seasons
Columbus Pan
Columbus Pan